Peeping Tom is a 1960 British psychological horror-thriller film directed by Michael Powell, written by Leo Marks, and starring Carl Boehm, Anna Massey, and Moira Shearer. The film revolves around a serial killer who murders women while using a portable film camera to record their dying expressions of terror. Its title derives from the expression "peeping Tom", which describes a voyeur.

The film's controversial subject matter and its extremely harsh reception by critics had a severely negative impact on Powell's career as a director in the United Kingdom. However, it attracted a cult following, and in later years, it has been re-evaluated and is now widely considered a masterpiece, and a progenitor of the contemporary slasher film. The British Film Institute named it the 78th greatest British film of all time, and in 2017 a poll of 150 actors, directors, writers, producers and critics for Time Out magazine saw it ranked the 27th best British film ever.

The music score was written by Brian Easdale and performed by Australian pianist Gordon Watson.

Plot

In London, Mark Lewis (Carl Boehm) meets Dora (Brenda Bruce), a prostitute, covertly filming her with a camera hidden under his coat. Shown from the point of view of the camera viewfinder, he follows the woman into her flat, murders her, and later watches the film in his den. The following morning, Lewis films the police's removal of Dora's corpse from her home, posing as a reporter.

Lewis is a member of a film crew who aspires to become a filmmaker himself. He also works part-time photographing soft-porn pin-up pictures of women, sold under the counter. He is a shy, reclusive young man who hardly socializes outside of his workplace. He lives in the house of his late father, renting most of it via an agent while posing as a tenant himself. Helen Stephens (Anna Massey), a sweet-natured young woman who lives with her blind mother in the flat below his, befriends him out of curiosity after he has been discovered spying on her 21st birthday party.

Mark reveals to Helen through home films taken by his father that, as a child, he was used as a guinea pig for his father's psychological experiments on fear and the nervous system. Mark's father would study his son's reaction to various stimuli, such as lizards he put on his bed and would film the boy in all sorts of situations, even going as far as recording his son's reactions as he sat with his mother on her deathbed. He kept his son under constant watch and even wired all the rooms so that he could spy on him. Mark's father's studies enhanced his reputation as a renowned psychologist.

Mark arranges with Vivian (Moira Shearer), a stand-in at the studio, to make a film after the set is closed; he then kills her and stuffs her into a prop trunk. The body is discovered later during shooting by Diane, a female cast member who has already antagonized the director by fainting for real at points which are not in the script. The police link the two murders and notice that each victim died with a look of utter terror on her face. They interview everyone on the set, including Mark, who always keeps his camera running, claiming that he is making a documentary.

Helen goes out to dinner with Mark, even persuading him to leave his camera behind for once, and briefly kisses him once they return. Her mother, Mrs. Stephens, finds his behavior peculiar, being aware, despite her blindness, that Mark often looks through Helen's window. Mrs. Stephens is waiting inside Mark's flat after his evening out with her daughter. Unable to wait until she leaves due to his compulsion, he begins screening his latest snuff film with her still in the room. She senses how emotionally disturbed he is and threatens to move, but Mark reassures her that he will never photograph or film Helen.

A psychiatrist is called to the set to console Diane. He chats with Mark and is familiar with his father's work. The psychiatrist relates the details of the conversation to the police, noting that Mark has "his father's eyes". Mark is tailed by the police to the newsagents, where he takes photographs of the pin-up model Milly (Pamela Green). Slightly later, it emerges that Mark has killed Milly before returning home.

Helen, who is curious about Mark's films, finally runs one of them. She becomes visibly upset and then frightened when he catches her. Mark reveals that he makes the films so that he can capture the fear of his victims. He has mounted a round mirror atop his camera so that he can capture the reactions of his victims as they see their impending deaths. He points the tripod's knife towards Helen's throat but refuses to kill her.

The police arrive and Mark realizes he is cornered. As he planned from the very beginning, he impales himself on the knife with the camera running, providing the finale for his documentary. The last shot shows Helen crying over Mark's dead body as the police enter the room.

Cast

Themes
Peeping Tom has been praised for its psychological complexity, which incorporates the "self-reflexive camera" as a plot device, as well as the themes of child abuse, sadomasochism, and scopophilic fetishism. On the surface, the film is about the Freudian relationships between the protagonist and, respectively, his father, and his victims. However, several critics argue that the film is as much about the voyeurism of the audience as they watch the protagonist's actions. Roger Ebert, in his 1999 review of the film for his "Great Films" series, states that "the movies make us into voyeurs. We sit in the dark, watching other people's lives. It is the bargain the cinema strikes with us, although most films are too well-behaved to mention it".

Martin Scorsese, who has long been an admirer of Powell's works, has stated that this film, along with Federico Fellini's 8½, contains all that can be said about directing:

According to Paul Wells, the film deals with the anxieties of British culture in regarding sexual repression, patriarchal obsession, voyeuristic pleasure and perverse violence. The impossible task in the film is the quest to photograph fear itself.

In the opinion of Peter Keough, the death scenes of the film would provide a field day to Freudian psychoanalysis and deconstructionists. Cinema here is equated to sexual aggression and a death wish, the camera to the phallus, photography to violation, and film to ritualized voyeurism. The emphasis of the film lies on morbidity, not on eroticism. In a memorable sequence, an attractive, semi-nude female character turns to the camera and reveals a disfiguring facial scar. This peeping tom is turned on not by naked bodies, but naked fear. And as Mark laments, whatever he photographs is lost to him. Mark is a loner whose only companion is his film camera. He is also the victim of his father's studies in the phenomenon of fear in children, a human guinea pig subjected to sadistic experiments. His love interest Helen has her own fascination with a morbid gaze. She is a children's writer whose book concerns a magic camera and what it photographs.

Relationship with Hitchcock's films
The themes of voyeurism in Peeping Tom are also explored in several films by Alfred Hitchcock. In his book on Hitchcock's 1958 film Vertigo, film historian Charles Barr points out that the film's title sequence and several shots seem to have inspired moments in Peeping Tom.

Chris Rodley's documentary A Very British Psycho (1997) draws comparisons between Peeping Tom and Hitchcock's Psycho; the latter film was given its New York premiere in June 1960, two months after Peeping Toms premiere in London. Both films feature as protagonists atypically mild-mannered serial killers who are obsessed with their parents. However, despite containing material similar to Peeping Tom, Psycho became a box-office success and only increased the popularity and fame of its director (although the film was widely criticized in the English press). One reason suggested in the documentary is that Hitchcock, seeing the negative press reaction to Peeping Tom, decided to release Psycho without a press screening.

In his early career, Powell worked as a stills photographer and in other positions on Hitchcock's films, and the two were friends throughout their careers. A variant of Peeping Toms main conceit, The Blind Man, was one of Hitchcock's unproduced films around this time. Here, a blind pianist receives the eyes of a murder victim, but their retinas retain the image of the murder.

According to Isabelle McNeill, the film fits well within the slasher film subgenre, which was influenced by Psycho. She lists a number of elements which it shares with both Psycho and the genre in general:
 a recognizably human killer, who stands as the psychotic product of a sick family
 the victim being a beautiful and sexually active woman
 the location of the murder being not within a home, but within some other "terrible place"
 the weapon being something other than a gun
 the attack registered from the victim's point of view and coming with shocking suddenness
She finds that the film actually goes further than Psycho into slasher territory through introducing a series of female victims, and with Helen Stephens functioning as the bright and sympathetic final girl.

Production

Writing
Screenwriter Leo Marks based portions of the film on his experience growing up as the son of Benjamin Marks, who owned the Marks & Co book store in London; elements of Peeping Tom is based on his observations of inner-city residents who frequented his father's store. The prostitute, Dora, who is murdered in the film's opening scene, was based on a real-life prostitute who was a regular patron of the Marks & Co book store. Additionally, Marks stated he was inspired to write a horror story and to become a codebreaker after reading "The Gold-Bug" by American writer Edgar Allan Poe. While writing the script, Marks believed the motivations behind Lewis' murder to be entirely sexual, though he would state in retrospect that he felt the psychological compulsion of the character was less sexual than it was unconscious. Prior to writing the screenplay for Peeping Tom, Marks, a polymath, had worked as cryptographer during World War II.

Casting and filming
Cohen originally wanted a star to play the lead role and suggested Dirk Bogarde but the Rank Organisation, who had him under contract, refused to loan him out. Laurence Harvey was attached for a while but pulled out during pre-production and Powell ended up casting German-Austrian actor Karlheinz Böhm (billed as Carl Boehm). Böhm, who was a friend of Powell's, noted that their prior acquaintance helped him psychoanalyze and "go into very, very special details" of the character. Böhm saw Lewis as a sympathetic character, whom he felt "great pity" for. In a 2008 interview, Böhm stated that he could identify with the character because he also stood for a long time in the shadow of his famous father, conductor Karl Böhm, and had a difficult relationship with him. Böhm also stated that he interpreted his character as being traumatized by growing up under the Nazi Regime.

Pamela Green, then a well-known glamour model in London, was cast in the role of Milly, one of Lewis's victims, who appears nude onscreen in the moments leading up to her murder scene. Her appearance marked the first scene in British cinema to feature frontal nudity.

Filming took six weeks beginning in October 1959. The film was financed by Nat Cohen at Anglo-Amalgamated with other funds from the National Film Finance Corporation.

Release
Peeping Tom was first released in the United Kingdom by Anglo-Amalgamated, premiering in London on 7 April 1960. It is often considered part of a Sadean trilogy with Horrors of the Black Museum (1959) and Circus of Horrors (1960). The three films had different production companies but the same distributor. They are connected through their themes of voyeurism, disfigurement, and sadistic figures. Anglo-Amalgamated films were typically released in the United States by American International Pictures through a deal between the two companies. But AIP was not interested in releasing Peeping Tom, apparently skeptical of its ability to satisfy audiences.

In the United States, the film was released by importer and distributor Astor Pictures in 1962. It was released simultaneously to the markets for genre horror films, art films, and exploitation films. It failed to find an audience and was one of the least successful releases by Astor. The film received a B rating from the National Legion of Decency, signifying "morally objectionable in part" content. The organization identified voyeurism and sadism as key elements of the film in its rating.

Censorship 
When Peeping Tom was first released in Italy in 1960 the Committee for the Theatrical Review of the Italian Ministry of Cultural Heritage and Activities rated it as VM16: not suitable for children under 16. The reason for the age restriction, cited in the official documents, is: the storyline is shocking and several scenes are not suitable for minors. In order for the film to be screened publicly, the Committee imposed the removal of the following scenes: 1) two scenes taking place in the photographer's studio, in particular, those in which Milly is shown alone, fully dressed and half-undressed, in front of the mirror because she is indecent; 2) two other scenes showing a woman lying on the bed excessively half-undressed, because she is indecent. 
The official document number is: 32987, it was signed on 21 October 1960 by Minister Renzo Helfer. It was banned in Finland until 1981.

Home media
Peeping Tom has received several DVD releases. In the United Kingdom, it was released by Studio Canal and Warner Bros., and later in a six-DVD box set which also includes the films I Know Where I'm Going! and A Canterbury Tale. In 2007, it received a new DVD release from Optimum Releasing in the United Kingdom, followed by a 50th Anniversary Blu-ray release in 2010.

The film was released in the United States by The Criterion Collection on LaserDisc on 23 March 1994 and on DVD on 16 November 1999. The Criterion release of the film has been out of print since at least 2010.

Reception

Contemporaneous
Peeping Toms depiction of violence and its lurid sexual content made it a controversial film on initial release and the critical backlash heaped on the film was a major factor in finishing Powell's career as a director in the United Kingdom. Karlheinz Böhm later remembered that after the film's premiere, nobody from the audience went to shake the hand of him or Michael Powell. A contemporary assessment of the film published in The Telegraph noted that the film effectively "killed" Powell's career. British reviews tended towards the hyperbolic in negativity, an example being a review published in The Monthly Film Bulletin which likened Powell to the Marquis de Sade.

Derek Hill, reviewer of the Tribune suggested that "the only really satisfactory way to dispose of Peeping Tom would be to shovel it up and flush it swiftly down the nearest sewer". Len Mosley writing for the Daily Express said that the film was more nauseating and depressing than the leper colonies of East Pakistan, the back streets of Bombay, and the gutters of Calcutta. Caroline Lejeune of The Observer wrote: "It's a long time since a film disgusted me as much as Peeping Tom", ultimately deeming it a "beastly film".

Critical reappraisal
Peeping Tom earned a cult following in the years after its initial release, and since the 1970s has received a critical reappraisal. Powell noted ruefully in his autobiography: "I make a film that nobody wants to see and then, thirty years later, everybody has either seen it or wants to see it". An account of the film's steady reappraisal can be found in Scorsese on Scorsese, edited by Ian Christie and David Thompson. Martin Scorsese mentions that he first heard of the film as a film student in the early 1960s, when Peeping Tom opened in only one theatre in Alphabet City, which, Scorsese notes, was a seedy district of New York. The film was released in a cut black-and-white print but immediately became a cult fascination among Scorsese's generation. Scorsese states that the film, in this mutilated form, influenced Jim McBride's David Holzman's Diary. Scorsese himself first saw the film in 1970 through a friend who owned an uncut 35mm colour print. In 1978, Scorsese was approached by a New York distributor, Corinth Films, which asked for $5,000 for a wider re-release. Scorsese gladly complied with their request, which allowed the film to reach a wider audience than its initial cult following. Vincent Canby wrote of the film in The New York Times in 1979: 

Film theorist Laura Mulvey echoed a similar sentiment, writing: "Peeping Tom is a film of many layers and masks; its first reviewers were unable even to see it at face value. Entrenched in the traditions of English realism, these early critics saw an immoral film set in real life whose ironic comment on the mechanics of film spectatorship and identification confused them as viewers. But Peeping Tom offers realistic cinematic images that relate to the cinema and nothing more. It creates a magic space for its fiction somewhere between the camera’s lens and the projector’s beam of light on the screen".

Before his death in 1990, Powell saw the reputation of Peeping Tom rise and rise. Contemporarily, the film is considered a masterpiece and among the best horror films of all time. In 2004, the magazine Total Film named Peeping Tom the 24th greatest British film of all time, and in 2005, the same magazine listed it as the 18th greatest horror film of all time. The film contains the 38th of Bravo Channel's 100 Scariest Movie Moments. The Guardian named it the 10th best horror film of all time in 2010, and a 2017 review in The Telegraph of the best British films ever made, states, "contemporary critics in 1960 may have overlooked that voyeurism was its central theme. But who is the voyeur?"

Film aggregate Rotten Tomatoes has awarded the film a 95% rating, based on 56 reviews and an average score of 8.7/10. The website's consensus is: "Peeping Tom is a chilling, methodical look at the psychology of a killer, and a classic work of voyeuristic cinema".

Cultural references
 Mike Patton's band Peeping Tom, and its self-titled album, are named in tribute to this film.
 During a reminiscence in David Foster Wallace's novel Infinite Jest, Dr. James O. Incandenza, the man who went on to make a film that literally kills its audience, refers to having "still-posters from Powell's Peeping Tom" in his childhood bedroom.
 A dialog of the film has been sampled for the beginning of Railway Jam on the So Tough album (1993) by Saint Etienne.
 A campaign video for the 2014 spring/summer Alexander McQueen collection was based on the opening scene of the film. The video features Kate Moss in the role of the killer's victim.
 Edgar Wright's Last Night in Soho (2021) is heavily inspired, both thematically and in use of film language, by the film.

See also
 BFI Top 100 British films
 List of films featuring surveillance

References

Works cited

Further reading

External links

 
 
 . Full synopsis and film stills (and clips viewable from UK libraries).
 Reviews and articles at Powell & Pressburger Pages.
Martin Scorsese on Peeping Tom and Michael Powell
 They made the critics scream, but now these films are classics
 Peeping Tom in The Numbers

1960 films
1960 horror films
1960s horror thriller films
1960s psychological thriller films
1960s serial killer films
1960s slasher films
British horror thriller films
British serial killer films
British slasher films
1960s English-language films
Films about blind people
Films about filmmaking
Films about security and surveillance
Films by Powell and Pressburger
Films directed by Michael Powell
Films set in London
Films shot at Pinewood Studios
Films shot in London
Films about snuff films
Censored films
Films about photographers
1960s British films